The following were mayors of Wycombe, Buckinghamshire, England:

John Sandwell: 1346-9
Nicholas Sperlyng: 1388-90 and 1397-8
William atte Dene  1365-6 and 1370–1.
William Clerk: 1419-20
Alderman W. Birch: 1902

References

 Wycombe
High Wycombe
Wycombe